Takis may refer to:

 Takis (snack), a spicy, roll-shaped snack
 Takis Christoforidis, a Greek actor
 Takis Fotopoulos, a Greek political philosopher
 Takis Ikonomopoulos, a Greek football player
 Takis Kanellopoulos a Greek film director
 Takis Mavris, a Cypriot football player
 Takis Mehmet Ali, German politician of Greek descent
 Takis Mousafiris, a Greek Aromanian composer and songwriter
 Panayiotis Vassilakis, a Greek artist commonly known as Takis